Vincenzo Montefusco (1852 – 1912 in Rome) was an Italian painter.

He was born in Cava dei Tirreni in Campania. He studied under Domenico Morelli in Naples, and dedicated himself to Genre painting and landscape paintings. Many of his paintings were sold by the Goupil Gallery in Paris. Among his works are Lo scrivano pubblico; Sul Vesuvio; Santa Lucia; Pescivendolo; Un brindisi; I fidanzati; and Venditrice di zucche, He also painted in watercolors; in 1881 at Milan, he exhibited three watercolors.

References

19th-century Italian painters
Italian male painters
20th-century Italian painters
1852 births
1912 deaths
Painters from Naples
Italian genre painters
Italian landscape painters
People from Cava de' Tirreni
19th-century Italian male artists
20th-century Italian male artists